Jeyran Bayramova (1896-1987) was an Azerbaijani women's rights activist and politician (Communist). She was a pioneer of the first organized women's movement of her country. 

She was the founder of the Ali Bayramov Club, the organization of the Azerbaijani women's movement.

References

 

1896 births
1987 deaths
20th-century Azerbaijani women politicians
20th-century Azerbaijani politicians
Azerbaijani feminists
Soviet politicians